is a 1970 Japanese horror film directed by Michio Yamamoto.

Plot
Returning to Tokyo from a six month business trip overseas, Kazuhiko leaves to visit his girlfriend Yuko at her isolated country home. After a week when nothing is heard from him, his sister Keiko and her fiancé Hiroshi go to find him. Yuko's mother Shidu tells them that he left after being told that Yuko had died when a landslide struck her car two weeks before he arrived. Keiko suspects there is more to the story. She and Hiroshi stay and try to trace her brother's last steps and end up uncovering tragic and horrifying secrets about Shidu and Yuko.

Cast
 Yukiko Kobayashi as Yuko Nonomura
 Yoko Minazake as Shidu Nonomura, Yuko's mother
 Atsuo Nakamura as Kazuhiko Sagawa, Yuko's fiancé
 Kayo Matsuo as Keiko Sagawa
 Akira Nakao as Hiroshi Takagi, Keiko's fiancé
 Jun Usami as Dr. Yamaguchi
 Sachio Sakai as Taxi driver
 Kaku Takashina as Genzo

Production
The Vampire Doll was the first of three vampire films made by Toho studios in the 1970s. The Vampire Doll was followed by Lake of Dracula (1971) and Evil of Dracula (1974).

Release
The Vampire Doll was released in Japan on July 4, 1970. The film was released in an English-subtitled format in the United States under the title The Night of the Vampire on August 6, 1971. The release was limited only to Japanese theatres in New York and Los Angeles. The film has also gone under the title Legacy of Dracula.

Reception
The New York Times gave the film a positive review, stating that the director "tells his grisly story with a cool taciturn detachment. Don't be fooled by what seems a conventional staging. There is plently lurking around the bend, some of it is hair-raising". The review also noted that the film was "exceptionally well-written, with a denouement that is fascinating and—well, almost credible. The acting is on a par with the rest".

Home media
In 2018, Arrow Films released The Vampire Doll, along with Lake of Dracula and Evil of Dracula, in a single Blu-ray set titled The Bloodthirsty Trilogy. This release included uncompressed mono audio, Toho's export English dubs for Lake of Dracula and Evil of Dracula, a video appraisal by Kim Newman, original trailers, and a collector's booklet in the first pressing. The Vampire Doll is in Japanese language / subtitled only.

See also
 List of horror films of 1970
 List of Japanese films of 1970

References

Bibliography

External links
 

1970s Japanese-language films
1970 horror films
1970 films
Toho films
Japanese vampire films
Films produced by Tomoyuki Tanaka
Japanese supernatural horror films
1970s exploitation films
1970s Japanese films